Erbessa longiplaga is a moth of the family Notodontidae first described by William Warren in 1907. It is found in Brazil.

References

Moths described in 1907
Notodontidae of South America